Sašo Mijalkov (born 15 September 1965) was the ninth director of the Administration for Security and Counterintelligence (UBK) of the Republic of Macedonia.

Family
Sašo Mijalkov is the son of Jordan Mijalkov, the first Interior Minister of the Republic of Macedonia. He is first cousin of Nikola Gruevski the ex Prime Minister of the Republic of Macedonia. He is married to Aleksandra Mijalkova. In June 2014 he became the godfather of Zarko Lukovski current Executive Director of T-Mobile Macedonia.

Education 
Mijalkov holds an Economy degree from Ss. Cyril and Methodius University of Skopje and a master's degree from Prague University.

Career
From 1998 till 2000 Mijalkov was employed in the Ministry of Defense of Macedonia, from 2000 till 2001 he was adviser to the Prime Minister of the Republic of Macedonia, and from August 29, 2006 to May 12, 2015 he was the Director of UBK.

A report by the Organized Crime and Corruption Reporting Project states Mijalkov fails to report his investments as required by law.

In April 2022, Mijalkov was added to the US Treasury's Specially Designated Nationals List of individuals facing Balkans-related sanctions.

See also
 Law enforcement in the Republic of Macedonia

References

External links
 Mijalkov's Biography in Macedonian

1965 births
Living people
Macedonian politicians
People from Skopje